Galeodea is a genus of large sea snails, marine gastropod mollusks in the subfamily Cassinae of the family Cassidae.

Fossil record
This genus is known in the fossil record from the Cretaceous period to the Quaternary period (age range: from 99.7 to 0.126 million years ago.). Fossil shells within this genus have been found all over the world.

Species
Species within the genus Galeodea include:
 † Galeodea aegyptiaca Oppenheim, 1906
 Galeodea alcocki (E. A. Smith, 1906)
 † Galeodea allani Finlay and Marwick, 1937
 †Galeodea apodemetes Marwick, 1934 
 Galeodea bicatenata Sowerby I, 1815
 Galeodea bituminata (K. Martin, 1933)
 † Galeodea californica B. L. Clark, 1942 
 † Galeodea depressa Buch, 1831
 Galeodea echinophora Linnaeus, 1758
 † Galeodea flemingi Beu & Maxwell, 1990 
 † Galeodea geniculosa Marwick, 1942 
 Galeodea hoaraui Drivas & Jay, 1989
 Galeodea keyteri (Kilburn, 1975)
 Galeodea koureos Gardner, 1939
 Galeodea leucodoma Dall, 1907
 Galeodea maccamleyi Ponder, 1983
 † Galeodea megacephala Philippi, 1843
 † Galeodea modesta (Suter, 1917) 
 † Galeodea petersoni Conrad, 1854
 † Galeodea planotecta Meyer and Aldrich, 1886
 Galeodea plauta Beu, 2008
 Galeodea rugosa (Linnaeus, 1771)
 † Galeodea senex (Hutton, 1873) 
 † Galeodea sulcata (Hutton, 1873) 
 † Galeodea sutterensis Dickerson, 1916
 † Galeodea tetratropis Gain, Belliard & Le Renard, 2017 
 Galeodea triganceae Dell, 1953
  †Galeodea wylliei Marwick, 1931 

 Species brought into synonymy 
 Galeodea beui Kreipl & Alf, 2002: synonym of Galeodea alcocki (E.A. Smith, 1906)
 Galeodea carolimartini Beets, 1943 † : synonym of Galeodea bituminata (K. Martin, 1933)
 Galeodea echinophorella Habe, 1961: synonym of Galeodea bituminata (K. Martin, 1933)
 Galeodea javana (K. Martin, 1879) †: synonym of Eudolium crosseanum (Monterosato, 1869) (Recombination of synonym)
 Galeodea marginalba Yamamoto & Sakurai, 1977: synonym of Galeodea bituminata (K. Martin, 1933)
 Galeodea nipponica (Sakurai & Habe in Habe, 1961): synonym of  Galeodea alcocki (E. A. Smith, 1906)
 Galeodea noharai Noda, 1980 † : synonym of Galeodea bituminata (K. Martin, 1933)
 Galeodea postcoronata Sacco, 1890: synonym of Galeodea echinophora (Linnaeus, 1758) 
 Galeodea susanae Schenck, 1926 †: synonym of Galeodea sutterensis Dickerson, 1916 †
 Galeodea tyrrhena (Gmelin, 1791): synonym of Galeodea rugosa (Linnaeus, 1771)

References 

 Finlay, H. J.; Marwick, J. (1937). The Wangaloan and associated molluscan faunas of Kaitangata-Green Island subdivision. New Zealand Geological Survey Palæontological Bulletin. 15, 1–140, 18 pls.
 Beu A.G. (2008) Recent deep-water Cassidae of the world. A revision of Galeodea, Oocorys, Sconsia, Echinophoria and related taxa, with new genera and species (Mollusca, Gastropoda). In Héros V., Cowie R.H. & Bouchet P. (eds), Tropical Deep-Sea Benthos 25. Mémoires du Muséum National d'Histoire Naturelle 196: 269-387

External links
 Link D.H.F. (1807-1808). Beschreibung der Naturalien-Sammlung der Universität zu Rostock. Rostock: Adlers Erben.